Zoom Airways was a cargo airline based in Dhaka, Bangladesh. Formed in 2002 as Z-Airways and Services, the airline operates cargo charter flights in Bangladesh and in the South Asia region. In 2005, the airline was renamed to Zoom Airways.

Fleet
The Zoom Airways fleet consisted of the following aircraft (as of 27 December 2008) :

 1 BAe 748 Series 2B
 1 Lockheed L-1011-500 Tristar
 2 Boeing 737

References

Defunct airlines of Bangladesh
Airlines established in 2002
Defunct cargo airlines
Bangladeshi companies established in 2002
2009 disestablishments in Bangladesh
Airlines disestablished in 2009